USS Borie may refer to:

 , a  commissioned in 1920, served in World War II and sunk following battle damage in 1943.

United States Navy ship names